Grozdev (from гроздь meaning cluster) is a Russian masculine surname, its feminine counterpart is Grozdeva. It may refer to
Maria Grozdeva (born 1972), Bulgarian sport shooter
Sava Grozdev (born 1950), Bulgarian mathematician and educator

Russian-language surnames
Bulgarian-language surnames